The Old Delta Democrat Times Building is a historic building in Greenville, in the state of Mississippi in the Southern United States.

Location
The building is located at 201-203 Main Street in Downtown Greenville, the county seat of Washington County, Mississippi, in the Southern United States.

History
The two-storey building was completed circa 1880-1882. It was acquired in 1880 for US$700 by John G. Arche and Samuel Brown, the owners of Brown & Arche, a mill and machine company. It was sold to the Lake family in 1902, who remained the owners until 1977.

The second floor was rented to the Greenville Temple Association, a Freemason lodge, from 1883 to 1914. The first floor was rented to the Greenville Bank and Trust Company from 1906 to 1910. From 1943 to 1968, the building was rented by the Delta Democrat Times. Later, it was rented to the Mississippi Industries for the Blind.

Heritage significance
It has been listed on the National Register of Historic Places since March 25, 1982.

References

Newspaper headquarters in the United States
Greenville, Mississippi
Former Masonic buildings in Mississippi
Commercial buildings on the National Register of Historic Places in Mississippi
National Register of Historic Places in Washington County, Mississippi
1880 establishments in Mississippi
Clubhouses on the National Register of Historic Places in Mississippi